Dorothy Evelyn McEvoy (30 July 1910 – 20 April 1994) was an English cricketer who played as a right-arm pace bowler. She appeared in five Test matches for England between 1949 and 1951. She played domestic cricket for Surrey.

References

External links
 
 

1910 births
1994 deaths
Cricketers from Liverpool
England women Test cricketers
Surrey women cricketers